B89 may refer to :
 Sicilian Defence, Scheveningen Variation, according to the list of chess openings
 Bundesstraße 89, a German road; see Bundesautobahn 71